Charles Jacobs Peterson (July 20, 1818 - March 4, 1887) was an American author and publisher.

Biography
Peterson was born in Philadelphia and studied law at the University of Pennsylvania, but never practiced law. He became an owner and partner in The Saturday Evening Post and editor at Graham's Magazine early in his career, and in 1842 founded Peterson's Magazine. This became a popular women's journal, which he edited until his death.

In 1852, Peterson published the novel The Cabin and Parlor; or, Slaves and Masters under the pseudonym J. Thornton Randolph, an early example of the Anti-Tom literature which arose in response to Uncle Tom's Cabin. It was published by T.B. Peterson, Ltd.; Theophilus B. Peterson was one of Charles' brothers and a leading publisher of cheap and sensational fiction. Peterson was not necessarily defending the institution of slavery, but instead a gradualism for ending of slavery in future instead of a destruction which would fracture the United States. After the American Civil War broke out, he was clearly on the Union side.
He is interred at Laurel Hill Cemetery, Philadelphia.

Selected bibliography
Some were originally published in serial form in Graham's Magazine or Peterson's:
 Agnes Courtenay (1847)
 The Oath of Marion (1847)
 Grace Dudley (1849)
 The Valley Farm (1850)
 Cruising in the Last War (1850)
 The Cabin and Parlor; or, Slaves and Masters (as J. Thornton Randolph) (1852)
 Kate Aylesford (1855)
 The Old Stone Mansion (1859)
 Mabel or Darkness at Dawn (18??)

Nonfiction
 Military Heroes of the Revolution (8 volumes) (1847)
 Military Heroes of the War of 1812 and the Mexican War (1848)
 Naval Heroes of the United States (1850)
 The American navy: being an authentic history of the United States navy, and biographical sketches of American naval heroes, from the formation of the navy to the close of the Mexican war (1857)

References

1818 births
1887 deaths
American magazine publishers (people)
Writers from Philadelphia
American naval historians
American male non-fiction writers
Burials at Laurel Hill Cemetery (Philadelphia)
Historians from Pennsylvania
19th-century American businesspeople